SQHC may refer to:
 Sporulenol synthase, an enzyme
 Syrian-Qatari Holding Company